The Assembly of States Parties of the International Criminal Court (ICC) elects a President to serve a three-year term. It also elects a First Vice-President and a Second Vice-President to serve three-year terms. This is a list of the Presidents and Vice-Presidents of the Assembly of States Parties since the ICC's inception in 2002.

Presidents

Vice-Presidents

Vice-Presidents in The Hague

Vice-Presidents in New York

External links
Assembly of States Parties of the International Criminal Court: official site

References 

 
Law-related lists